Jorge Ottati (born in Montevideo, Uruguay) is a television and radio sports announcer who currently works for beIN SPORTS. His father is Prof. Jorge Ottati, a renowned sportscaster.

He started his broadcasting career in Uruguay at the young age of 16 in CX 4 Radio Capital. He also worked for several radio stations such as CX 32 Radiomundo, CX 30 Radio Nacional, CX 38 SODRE, CX 36 Radio Centenario, CX 28 Radio Imparcial and CX 12 Radio Oriental.

In 1996, he started working in television with Canal 10 for the Atlanta Olympic Games, and then he was hired by TVC Network as a host and play-by-play announcer for professional basketball games.

Broadcasting career in the United States

PSN - Pan-American Sports Network (Cable Television) – Hollywood, Florida  (2000–2002)

Basketball – play-by-play announcer
NBA
WNBA
Liga Sudamericana de Basquetbol

Studio host
2000 Sydney Olympic Games Opening Ceremony
NBA Preview Show
Sydney 2000 Daily Show
El Show de los Goles
French League Highlights Show
Italian League Highlights Show
Mercosur Preview Show
Libertadores Preview Show
Pepsi 2001 Mexican Soccer
Sudamerica Rumbo al Mundial
The Best of Le Championnat
Liga Sudamericana Preview Show

Soccer – play-by-play announcer
Copa CONMEBOL Libertadores
CONCACAF Champions League 
Italian League
2002 World Cup South America Qualifiers (CONMEBOL) 
2002 World Cup North, Central America and Caribbean Qualifiers (CONCACAF)
2002 World Cup Europe Qualifiers 
French League
Mexican League
Portuguese League
English FA Cup
UEFA Cup
Dallas Cup
USA Gold Cup
Copa Mercosur
Copa Merconorte
Sudamericano Sub-20 Ecuador
Sudamericano Sub-17 Peru 
European Friendly Games

Voice-overs
Sportsworld
Futbol Mundial
Transworld Sports
Wild Spirits
Legends of Wimbledon

Univision, TeleFutura and Galavision (Broadcast Television) - Miami, Florida  (2004–2012)

Studio anchor and co-host
Contacto Deportivo (TeleFutura)

Sports anchor
Copa América Al Día – Perú 2004 (Galavision)
En Vivo y Directo (TeleFutura)

Color commentator and host
Mundial Sub-20 – Holanda 2005 (TeleFutura/Galavision)
Mundial Sub-17 – Perú 2005 (Galavision)
Fútbol Liga Mexicana (Galavision/TeleFutura)
Copa Oro 2005 (Galavision/TeleFutura)
Copa Confederaciones – Alemania 2005 (Galavision/TeleFutura)
Torneo Uncaf – Guatemala 2005 (Galavision)
Torneo Uncaf – El Salvador 2007 (Galavision)

Studio host
Solo Boxeo de Miller/Solo Boxeo Tecate

References

American male journalists
Uruguayan expatriates in the United States
Uruguayan television journalists
Uruguayan people of Italian descent
Year of birth missing (living people)
Living people
Association football commentators
National Basketball Association broadcasters
Uruguayan radio journalists
Uruguayan radio presenters